Donald "Don" Mantooth (born June 20, 1952) is an American actor  best known for his roles in films such as Earthquake, Uncommon Valor, The California Kid, and  The Seekers, and TV series such as Marcus Welby, M.D., Emergency!, Columbo (“Swan Song”), and Knight Rider.  He is the younger brother of Randolph Mantooth.

Filmography

References

External links
 

1952 births
American male film actors
American male television actors
Living people